The Campanian Ignimbrite eruption (CI, also CI Super-eruption) was a major volcanic eruption in the Mediterranean during the late Quaternary, classified 7 on the Volcanic Explosivity Index (VEI). Estimates of the date and magnitude of the eruption(s), and the amount of ejected material have varied considerably during several centuries the site has been studied. This applies to most significant volcanic events that originated in the Campanian Plain, as it is one of the most complex volcanic structures in the world. However, continued research, advancing methods, and accumulation of volcanological, geochronological, and geochemical data have improved the dates' accuracy.

The accuracy of these numbers is of significance for marine geologists, climatologists, palaeontologists, paleo-anthropologists and researchers of related fields as the event coincides with a number of global and local phenomena, such as widespread discontinuities in archaeological sequences, climatic oscillations and biocultural modifications.

Etymology

The term Campanian refers to the Campanian volcanic arc located mostly but not exclusively in the region of Campania in southern Italy that stretches over a subduction zone created by the convergence of the African and Eurasian plates. It should not be confused with the Late Cretaceous stage Campanian.

The word ignimbrite was coined by New Zealand geologist Patrick Marshall from Latin ignis (fire) and imber (shower)) and -ite. It means the deposits that form as a result of a pyroclastic eruption.

Background

It is composed of the older Campanian Ignimbrite caldera, the younger Neapolitan Yellow Tuff caldera and widely scattered sub-aerial and submarine vents from which the most recent eruptions have originated. The Fields sit upon a Pliocene – Quaternary Extensional domain with faults, that run North-East to South-West and North-West to South-East from the margin of the Apennine thrust belt. The sequence of deformation has been subdivided into three periods.

Phlegraean Periods
 The First Period, which includes the Campanian Ignimbrite Eruption, was the most decisive era in the Phlegraean Fields' geologic history. Beginning more than 40,000 years ago as the external caldera formed, subsequent caldera collapses and repeated volcanic activity took place within a limited area.
 During the Second Period, the smaller Neapolitan Yellow Tuff eruption (Neapolitan Yellow Tuff or NYT) took place around 15,000 years ago.
 Eruptions of the Third Period occurred during three intervals between 15,000–9,500 years ago, 8,600–8,200 years ago and from 4,800 to 3,800 years ago.

The structure's magma chamber remains active as there apparently are solfataras, hot springs, gas emissions and frequent episodes of large-scale up- and downlift ground deformation (Bradyseism) do occur.

The region's volcanic nature has been recognized since Antiquity, investigated and studied for many centuries. Methodical scientific research began in the late 19th century. The yellow tuff stone was extensively quarried for centuries, which left large underground cavities that served as aqueducts and cisterns for the collection of rain water.

The project was suspended in 2010 due to safety problems.

Eruptive sequence

The CI eruption has been interpreted as the largest volcanic eruption of the past 200,000 years in Europe. Tephra deposits indicate two distinct plume forming phases, a Plinian and a co-ignimbrite, characterized by multiple caldera-forming eruptions.

Plinian phase
Evidence shows that the eruption was a single event lasting 2 to 4 days. It was triggered by abrupt changes in composition, properties and physical state in the melt or overpressure in the magma chamber. The eruption started with phreatomagmatic explosions, followed by a Plinian eruption column, fed by simultaneous extraction of two magma layers. As gradually an unstable pulsating column formed, fed only by the most evolved magma due to upward migration of the fragmentation surface, reduced magma eruption rate, and/or activation of fractures, the Plinian phase ended. Emissions consisted of pumice and dark colored volcanic rock (scoria). The mafic minerals cover smaller areas than the more acidic members, also indicating a decrease of explosivity over the course of the eruption. The eruption column caused a large pumice-fall deposit to the east of the source area.

Pyroclastic density currents 
Textural and morphological features of the deposits, and areal distribution suggests that the eruption was of the type of highly expanded low-temperature pyroclastic cloud.

The pyroclastic sequence from base to top:
 densely welded ignimbrite and lithic-rich breccias
 sintered ignimbrite, low-grade ignimbrite and lithic-rich breccia
 lithic-rich breccia and spatter agglutinate (see Volcanic cone)
 low-grade ignimbrite

Ignimbrite deposit 

The ignimbrite is a gray, poorly to moderately welded, nearly saturated potassic trachyte, similar to many other trachytes of the Quaternary volcanic province of Campania. It consists of pumice and lithic fragments in a devitrified matrix that contains sanidine, lesser plagioclase rimmed by sanidine, two clinopyroxenes, biotite, and magnetite. The column collapse that generated the widespread ignimbrite deposit most likely occurred due to an increase of the Mass Eruption Rate (MER), (see Eruption column).

The immediate area was completely buried by thick layers of pyroclastic fragments, volcanic blocks, lapilli and ash. The greater ignimbrite deposit, mostly trachytic ash and pumice, covered an area of at least , encompassing most of the southern Italian peninsula and the eastern Mediterranean region.

A most recent work calculated the volume of the ignimbrite and updated the total eruptive volume to 457–660 km3 (181–265 km3 Dense Rock Equivalent). This volume corresponds to a mass of 4.7–6.9×1014 kg, to a Richter magnitude of 7.7–7.8 and to a VEI 7.

Global impact 

The event's recent dating at 39,280±110 years ago draws considerable scholarly attention as it marks a time interval characterized by biocultural modifications in western Eurasia and widespread discontinuities in archaeological sequences, such as the Middle to Upper Palaeolithic transition. At several archaeological sites of South-eastern Europe, the ash separates the cultural layers containing Middle Palaeolithic and/or Earliest Upper Palaeolithic assemblages from the layers in which Upper Palaeolithic industries occur. At some sites the CI tephra deposit coincides with a long interruption of paleo-human occupation.

Effect on climate 
The climatic importance of the eruption was tested in a three-dimensional sectional aerosol model that simulated the global aerosol cloud under glacial conditions. Black et al. (2015) calculate that up to 450 million kilograms (990 million pounds) of sulphur dioxide would have been accumulated into the atmosphere, driving down temperatures at least by 1–2 degrees Celsius (1.8–3.6 degrees Fahrenheit) for a period of 2–3 years.

Archaeology 
Many archaeological sites in south-eastern Europe keep evidence of eruption. Kostyonki–Borshchyovo archaeological complex which is about 40,000 years old was found to have a layer of sediment ash.

Effect on living organisms 
Sulphur dioxide and chloride emissions caused acidic rains, fluorine-laden particles become incorporated into plant matter, potentially inducing dental fluorosis, replete with eye, lung and organ damage in animal populations.

Neanderthal demise

The eruption coincided also with the final decline of the Neanderthal in Europe. The environmental stress associated with the CI may have contributed to the extinction of the Neanderthals in combination with societal upheaval in the Paleolithic era. The notion remains contested; nonetheless, sources admit that although the CI would have affected both modern humans and Neanderthals equally, the assumed capacity of modern humans for resilience and ingenuity over and above that of Neanderthals could have allowed modern humans to recover more quickly at Neanderthals' expense.

See also 
 Supervolcano

Footnotes

References

External links
 
 

Pre-Holocene volcanism
Campanian volcanic arc
Pleistocene volcanism
Pleistocene Europe
Prehistoric Italy
History of Campania
VEI-7 eruptions
Events that forced the climate
Volcanic eruptions in Italy
Plinian eruptions
Phlegraean Fields